Brett Aitken  (born 25 January 1971) is an Australian Olympic track cyclist. He has won three Olympic medals, including gold in the Madison event at the 2000 Olympics. He retired from cycling in 2004, but returned in 2006 to ride on the Oceania Tour. On 16 January 2001, he was awarded the Australian Sports Medal for his gold medal winning achievement.

Aitken was born in Adelaide and was affiliated with the Adelaide Cycling Club. He was also an Australian Institute of Sport scholarship holder.

References

1971 births
Living people
Australian male cyclists
Australian Institute of Sport cyclists
Cyclists at the 1992 Summer Olympics
Cyclists at the 1996 Summer Olympics
Cyclists at the 2000 Summer Olympics
Olympic gold medalists for Australia
Olympic silver medalists for Australia
Olympic bronze medalists for Australia
Olympic cyclists of Australia
Cyclists from Adelaide
Olympic medalists in cycling
Recipients of the Australian Sports Medal
UCI Track Cycling World Champions (men)
Medalists at the 1992 Summer Olympics
Commonwealth Games gold medallists for Australia
Commonwealth Games silver medallists for Australia
Medalists at the 1996 Summer Olympics
Medalists at the 2000 Summer Olympics
Commonwealth Games medallists in cycling
Australian track cyclists
Cyclists at the 1990 Commonwealth Games
Cyclists at the 1994 Commonwealth Games
Recipients of the Medal of the Order of Australia
Medallists at the 1990 Commonwealth Games
Medallists at the 1994 Commonwealth Games
20th-century Australian people